The 2020 RBC Tennis Championships of Dallas was a professional tennis tournament played on hard courts. It was the 23rd edition of the tournament and part of the 2020 ATP Challenger Tour. It took place in Dallas, United States between 3 and 9 February 2020.

Singles main-draw entrants

Seeds

 1 Rankings are as of January 20, 2020.

Other entrants
The following players received wildcards into the singles main draw:
  Nick Chappell
  Aleksandar Kovacevic
  Michael Redlicki
  Frances Tiafoe
  Evan Zhu

The following player received entry into the singles main draw as a special exempt:
  Daniel Elahi Galán

The following players received entry from the qualifying draw:
  Dennis Novikov
  Hunter Reese

Champions

Singles

 Jurij Rodionov def.  Denis Kudla 7–5, 7–6(12–10).

Doubles

 Dennis Novikov /  Gonçalo Oliveira def.  Luis David Martínez /  Miguel Ángel Reyes-Varela 6–3, 6–4.

References

2020 ATP Challenger Tour
2020
2020 in American tennis
2020 in sports in Texas
February 2020 sports events in the United States